Yang Fu ( 210s–230s), courtesy name Yishan, was a Chinese politician of the state of Cao Wei during the Three Kingdoms period of China. He previously served as a regional official in Liang Province during the late Eastern Han dynasty. In the 210s, when the warlord Ma Chao rebelled against the Han central government, occupied Liang Province by force and murdered some of the provincial officials, Yang Fu and his colleagues pretended to submit to Ma Chao. Later, they plotted a revolt against him and succeeded in forcing him out of Liang Province. During the reign of the second Wei emperor Cao Rui, Yang Fu proposed to the emperor to scale down his extravagant construction projects but the emperor ignored him.

Early life
Yang Fu was from Ji County (冀縣; or Jicheng 冀城), Tianshui Commandery, which is around present-day Gangu County, Gansu. He served as a minor official in the local commandery office in his youth. Once, when the military officers in his home commandery sought his opinion on who would win the battle of Guandu, he replied that "Lord Yuan (Yuan Shao) is lenient but indecisive, foxy but inconclusive; people won't be afraid of his might since he is indecisive, and he'll let opportunities slip by since he is inconclusive. Even he may be powerful now, he won't achieve anything great in the end. On the other hand, Lord Cao (Cao Cao) has ambition and vision, and he is able to make decisions without hesitation. His army is disciplined and strong, his officers come from a diverse range of backgrounds and are hardworking, so his forces will win." His prediction turned out to be accurate and he became famous throughout Liang Province for his foresight and brilliance. Later, Wei Kang, the Inspector of Liang Province, recruited him to be an Attendant Officer.

Struggle for Liang Province
In 211, a coalition of warlords from the west of Hangu Pass started a rebellion against the Han central government, which was under the control of the warlord Cao Cao. Cao Cao led his forces to fight the warlords at the Battle of Tong Pass and defeated them. Ma Chao, one of the leading warlords in the coalition, managed to escape to the territory of the Qiang and Hu tribes to recuperate. Cao Cao pressed on his attacks against the remnants of the coalition and pursued Ma Chao to Anding Commandery, but pulled back his forces after hearing about unrest in his territories in the east. During this time, Yang Fu warned Cao Cao, "Ma Chao has the courage of Ying Bu and Han Xin, and he has the support of the Qiang and Hu tribes. If you order the army to retreat now and don't make enough preparations here, we'll forfeit the commanderies in the area." Cao Cao applauded Yang Fu's proposal but could not adopt it because he had to deal with Su Bo's rebellion in Hejian Commandery and Sun Quan's attack on Ruxu.

In 213, as soon as Cao Cao and his army left Liang Province, as Yang Fu foresaw, Ma Chao attacked the commanderies in Liang Province with support from Zhang Lu, a warlord in Hanzhong Commandery. Ma Chao soon besieged Ji County, the last stronghold in Liang Province which remained under Han control. Despite Yang Fu's valiant efforts to resist the enemy, Ji County still fell to Ma Chao, and Yang Fu was forced to submit to Ma Chao. Disgruntled by Ma Chao's cruelty and treachery (including his murder of Wei Kang, the Inspector of Liang Province), Yang Fu and other officials in Liang Province secretly hatched a plot to drive Ma Chao out of Liang Province. Yang Fu lied to Ma Chao that he wanted to see to the funeral arrangements for his recently deceased wife and gained permission to leave Ji County. He then used the opportunity to contact the other officials and prepare for their revolt against Ma Chao.

In September 213, Yang Fu started a rebellion against Ma Chao in Lu County to lure Ma Chao to lead his troops out of Ji County to attack him. In the meantime, while Ma Chao was away, the other officials in Ji County responded to Yang Fu's call and killed Ma Chao's wife and child(ren), who were in Ji County. Ma Chao was unable to retake Lu County so he retreated back to Ji County, only to find his family dead and the city gates shut. He then led his remaining forces to attack Li County, where some of Yang Fu's relatives and the families of the officials who rebelled against him were, and killed them in revenge. During the battles against Ma Chao, Yang Fu sustained five wounds over his body and lost seven relatives. Ma Chao eventually gave up on Liang Province and fled to Hanzhong Commandery to join the warlord Zhang Lu.

Service under Cao Rui
Yang Fu continued serving in the Cao Wei state, founded by Cao Cao's son and successor Cao Pi, after the end of the Han dynasty in 220. He lived through the reigns of the first two Wei emperors, Cao Pi and Cao Rui, and was enfeoffed as a Secondary Marquis.

In 230, the Wei general Cao Zhen led an army to invade Wei's rival state Shu, but the advancement was thwarted by heavy rainfall, which lasted for more than a month and rendered the mountainous paths untraversable. Yang Fu, along with others, advised Cao Rui to order Cao Zhen to withdraw the Wei troops.

Later, when Cao Rui started on his extravagant construction projects and expansion of his imperial harem, Yang Fu repeatedly advised the emperor against such actions. However, Cao Rui ignored his advice. Yang Fu then sought permission to resign from his position as Minister Steward, but was denied. Since then, Cao Rui applauded Yang Fu for his suggestions but seldom acted on them.

Yang Fu died in an unknown year without much family property. He was succeeded by his grandson, Yang Bao, presumably because his son(s) died early.

See also
 Lists of people of the Three Kingdoms

References

 Chen, Shou (3rd century). Records of Three Kingdoms (Sanguozhi).
 Pei, Songzhi (5th century). Annotations to Records of the Three Kingdoms (Sanguozhi zhu).

2nd-century births
3rd-century deaths
Cao Wei politicians
Han dynasty politicians from Gansu
Officials under Cao Cao
People from Tianshui